Antonio Serrano Dávila (born 14 March 1979) is a Peruvian footballer who plays as a centre forward for Cobresol FBC in the Torneo Descentralizado.

Club career
Serrano started his career playing for Deportivo San Agustín in the 1996 Descentralizado season under manager Oscar Hamada. However San Agustín finished in last place at the end of the season and was relegated to the Segunda División Peruana (Second Division). He then played in the 1997 Segunda División season, but his club was further relegated at the end of the year.

The next season, he played for Copa Perú side Deportivo UPAO. In his second season there, Serrano helped the club reach promotion to the top-flight by winning the 1999 Copa Perú title.

From 2000–2001 he had his first experience abroad playing for El Salvador club C.D. FAS.

He returned to Peru in 2002 to play for Sport Boys first under manager Ramón Mifflin and later with Jorge Sampaoli. Serrano had one of his best seasons with the Chalacos as he managed to score 18 goals for them in the 2002 Descentralizado.

In January 2003 Serrano joined Alianza Lima.

In March 2007, Serrano joined Xiangxue Sun Hei in Hong Kong First Division League. He made 4 appearances in total and scored 2 goals, both against Hong Kong 08 on 6 April 2007. He left Xiangxue Sun Hei after the season ended in May.

International career
Serrano was called up by manager Paulo Autuori for his debut match with the Peru national football team on 23 February 2003. His debut match was a friendly against Haiti and finished in a 5-1 win for his side, with Serrano scoring the winning goal in the 19th minute.

Honours

Club
Deportivo UPAO
Copa Perú: 1999

Alianza Lima
Torneo Descentralizado: 2003

References

1979 births
Living people
People from San Martín Region
Association football forwards
Peruvian footballers
Peru international footballers
Peruvian Primera División players
C.D. FAS footballers
Sport Boys footballers
Club Alianza Lima footballers
Atlético Universidad footballers
Club Deportivo Universidad de San Martín de Porres players
FBC Melgar footballers
José Gálvez FBC footballers
Club Universitario de Deportes footballers
Sun Hei SC players
Juan Aurich footballers
Ayacucho FC footballers
Sport Áncash footballers
Total Chalaco footballers
Real Garcilaso footballers
Cobresol FBC footballers
Peruvian expatriate footballers
Expatriate footballers in El Salvador
Expatriate footballers in China